Nidorella is a genus of African flowering plants in the tribe Astereae within the family Asteraceae.

 Species

References

 
Asteraceae genera
Flora of Africa
Taxonomy articles created by Polbot